Events in the year 1882 in Portugal.

Incumbents
Monarch: Louis I
Prime Minister: Fontes Pereira de Melo

Events

Arts and entertainment

Sports

Births

16 January – António dos Santos Graça, ethnologist (d. 1956).
28 June – Josué Francisco Trocado, composer (d. 1962)
19 September – Domingos Leite Pereira, politician (died 1956)
3 December – Alfredo Pimenta, historian and poet (d. 1950)

Deaths
António Rodrigues Sampaio, politician (born 1806)

References

 
1880s in Portugal
Years of the 19th century in Portugal
Portugal